HMS Enchantress was the mercantile vessel of the same name, launched in 1802 at Ringmore. The British Royal Navy purchased her in 1804. She then spent her career sitting at Bristol serving as a storeship. She was transferred to the Customs service in 1817 and may have served with it until c.1850.

Career
Mercantile service
Enchantress entered Lloyd's Register in 1802 with John Cole, master, and trade Teignmouth-Dartmouth. This entry continued into 1805.

Royal Navy service
The Royal Navy purchased Enchantress in 1804 and commissioned her at Bristol in October 1805 under Lieutenant George M. Higginson. She then remained at Bristol. Between 1807 and 1811 her commander was Lieutenant Robert Pearce. Lieutenant James Pasley succeeded him in 1812, only to be succeeded in 1813 by Lieutenant Joshua L. Rowe. Enchantress, then lying at Pill, on 18 March 1813 fired minute guns during the funeral procession for Captain John Phillips, late regulating officer at Bristol. Lieutenant Charles Bostock took command of "Enchantress stationary receiving ship", on 7 April 1814. He remained into 1815.

Between May and June 1816 Enchantress was at Plymouth undergoing fitting as a receiving ship. Later she was fitted there as a quarantine ship for Milford. Still, on 18 September the "Principal Officers and Commissioners of His Majesty's Navy" offered "Enchantress armed Vessel, of 176 tons" for sale at Plymouth.

Enchantress failed to sell so between January and April 1817 she underwent fitting at Sheerness for transfer to the Revenue Service. She was transferred to the Blackwater River Service in August 1818.

Post-military service
It is not clear how long Enchantress served with the Customs service. During the period of the Coastal Blockade (1817–31), there was an Enchantress at Rye that served as the headquarters of the organization for Kent and Sussex. This vessel began operations in 1819, but by one account was the French vessel Rencontre, which had grounded on the coast of Sussex and been converted to this new role. The National Maritime Museum had records that indicate that there was an Enchantress extant c.1850, but it is not clear which vessel this was.

Citations

References

1802 ships
Age of Sail merchant ships
Merchant ships of the United Kingdom
Ships of the Royal Navy